The following is a list of people who have served as the mayor of Winston-Salem, North Carolina, as well as those who served in the predecessor towns of Winston and Salem.

Winston-Salem mayors serve 4-year terms.

Mayors of the town of Salem
Mayors of Salem from January 1857 to the merger with Winston in May 1913.

Charles Brietz (1857-1858)
E. A. Vogler (1858-1859)
Charles Brietz (1859-1860)
Dr. Augustus T. Zevely (1860-1863)
John G. Sides (1863-1864)
Joshua Boner (1864-1865)
Dr. Augustus T. Zevely (1865-1866)
Charles Brietz (1866-1867)
John P. Vest (1867-1868)
Augustus Fogle (1868-1873)
John P. Vest (1873-1874)
E.A. Vogler (1874-1875)
Rufus Lenoir Patterson (1875-1876)
Augustus Fogle (1876-1878)
Dr. J. F. Shaffner, Sr. (1878-1884)
C. H. Fogle (1884-1888)
Augustus Fogle (1888-1889)
Henry E. Fries (1889-1892)
J. H. Stockton (1892-1893)
T. B. Douthit (1893-1894)
C. S. Hauser (1894-1896)
Samuel E. Butner (1896-1901)
J. A. Vance (1901-1903)
Samuel E. Butner (1903-1907)
Frank H. Vogler (1907-1911)
Fred A. Fogle (1911-1913)

Mayors of the town of Winston
Mayors of Winston between January 1859 and May 1913.

William Barrow (1859-1860)	
P.A. Wilson (1860-1861)
Robert Gray (1861-1862)
H.K. Thomas (1862-1865)
Thomas J. Wilson (1865-1866)
T.T. Best (1866-1868)
Jacob Tise (1868-1871)
J.W. Alspaugh (1871-1872)
P.A. Wilson (1882-1883)
T.T. Best (1872-1873)
J.W. Alspaugh 1873-1874
T.T. Best (1874-1875)
J.W. Alspaugh (1875-1876)
D.P. Mast (1876)
A. B. Gorrell (1876-1877)
Martin Grogan (1877-1878)
A. B. Gorrell (1878-1882)
J.C. Buxton (1883-1884)
Samuel H. Smith (1884-1885)
Charles Buford (1885-1886)
Thomas J. Wilson (1886-1887)
Charles Buford (1887-1890)
D.P. Mast (1890-1892)
R. B. Kerner (1892-1893
Garland E. Webb	(1893-1894)
Eugene E. Gray (1894-1896)
P.W. Crutchfield (1896-1898)
A. B. Gorrell (1898)
J.F. Griffith (1898-1900)
Oscar B. Eaton (1900-1911)
Rufus I. Dalton (1911-1913)

Mayors of the City of Winston-Salem
Mayors after the 1913 merger of Winston and Salem.

Oscar B. Eaton (1913-1917)
Robert W. Gorrell (1917-1921)
James G. Hanes (1921-1925)
Thomas Barber (1925-1929)
George W. Coan (1929-1935)
W.T. Wilson (1935-1939)
James R Fain (1939-1941)
R.J. Reynolds (1941-1942)
J. Wilbur Crews (1942-1943)
George W. Coan (1943-1945)
George D. Lentz (1945-1949)
Marshall Kurfees (1949-1961)
John B. Surratt (1961-1963)
M.C. Benton (1963-1970)
Franklin Shirley (1970-1977)
Wayne Corpening (1977-1989)
Martha Wood (1989-1997)
Jack Cavanagh (1997-2001)
Allen Joines (2001-)

See also
 Timeline of Winston-Salem, North Carolina

References

Winston-Salem
Mayors